Pedro Gual is one of the 21 municipalities (municipios) that makes up the Venezuelan state of Miranda and, according to a 2007 population estimate by the National Institute of Statistics of Venezuela, the municipality has a population of 22,579.  The town of Cúpira is the municipal seat of the Pedro Gual Municipality. The municipality is named for 19th century Venezuelan President Pedro Gual Escandón.

Demographics
The Pedro Gual Municipality, according to a 2007 population estimate by the National Institute of Statistics of Venezuela, has a population of 22,579 (up from 19,379 in 2000). This amounts to 0.8% of the state's population.

Government
The mayor of the Pedro Gual Municipality is Manuel Alvarez, elected on October 31, 2004, with 47% of the vote.  He replaced Lenis Landaeta shortly after the elections.  The municipality is divided into two parishes; Cúpira and Machurucuto.

References

External links
pedrogual-miranda.gob.ve 

Municipalities of Miranda (state)